The Penn Manor School District is a large, rural/suburban, public school district located in Lancaster County, Pennsylvania. The Penn Manor School District encompasses approximately 110 square miles. Penn Manor School District serves residents of: Manor Township, Conestoga Township, Millersville Borough, Martic Township and Pequea Township. According to 2000 federal census data, it serves a resident population of 37,942. By 2010, the district's population was 41,376 people. In 2009, Penn Manor Sas $20,529 and the median family income was $55,708. The educational attainment levels for the Penn Manor School District population (25 years old and over) were 88.7% high school graduates and 25% college graduates.

Penn Manor School District operates one high school, two middle schools and seven elementary schools. Additionally the district offers a virtual school and an alternative school for grades 7th-12th. Penn Manor School District is a member of Lancaster-Lebanon Intermediate Unit (IU) 13, receiving a wide variety of services like specialized education for disabled students and hearing, speech and visual disability services and professional development for staff and faculty. High school students may choose to attend Lancaster County Career and Technology Center for training: in construction and mechanical trades, in allied health services; and in public safety careers among others.

Extracurriculars
Penn Manor School District offers a wide variety of clubs, activities and an extensive sports program. 
The district funds:

Varsity

Boys
Baseball - AAAA
Basketball- AAAA
Bowling - AAAA
Cross country - AAA
Football - AAAA
Golf - AAA
Lacrosse - AAAA
Soccer - AAA
Swimming and diving - AAA
Tennis - AAA
Track and field - AAA
Volleyball - AAA
Wrestling - AAA

Girls
Basketball - AAAA
Bowling - AAAA
Cheer - AAAA
Cross country - AAA
Field hockey - AAA
Golf - AAA
Lacrosse - AAAA
Soccer - AAA
Softball - AAAA
Swimming and diving - AAA
Tennis - AAA
Track and field - AA
Volleyball - AAA

Middle school sports

Boys
Basketball
Cross country
Football
Soccer
Track and field
Wrestling 

Girls
Basketball
Cross country
Field hockey
Soccer 
Track and field

According to PIAA directory July 2013

References

External links 
 Official website

School districts in Lancaster County, Pennsylvania